USS Prairie (AD-5), formerly Morgan Liner SS El Sol, was built in 1890 by William Cramp & Sons, Philadelphia. She was purchased by the United States Navy on 6 April 1898 from the Southern Pacific Company, and commissioned two days later at New York, Commander Charles J. Train in command.

History
Prairie was converted into an auxiliary cruiser and assigned at first to the Northern Patrol Squadron and later to the North Atlantic Fleet. During the Spanish–American War, she served in Cuban waters July and August 1898. On 25 August she stranded in dense fog 3 miles east of the Amagansett, New York Life saving Station. The United States Life Saving Service ferried 216 troops to shore. She was pulled off the next day by the tug Brittania. She returned to Fore River, Massachusetts on 28 August. She decommissioned on 15 March 1899 at Philadelphia.

Prairie was placed in reserve commission on 23 March 1899 and cruised with the naval militia off the Atlantic coast until she was decommissioned at New York on 18 February 1901. She carried government exhibits to France at the turn of the 20th century for the Paris Exposition. She was recommissioned at Boston on 9 November 1901 as a training ship, and remained with this mission until she was decommissioned at Boston on 14 June 1905.

She was recommissioned 26 September 1906 at Boston as a transport and was attached to the Atlantic Fleet. She protected American interests in Cuba, March to April 1907. Later, she resumed her training duties with the naval militia from May to September 1907, July to August 1908 and July to August 1909.

She took part on the U.S. occupation of Veracruz in 1914, firing her 3-inch guns at the Naval Academy and other tactical targets, on 21 April 1914.

Converted to a destroyer tender in late 1917, Prairie served during World War I.

Prairie was decommissioned for the final time on 22 November 1922 at San Diego, California, and was struck from the Navy List. She was sold on 22 June 1923 to Louis Rothenberg, Oakland, California.

References

Notes

External links
 Photo gallery at Naval Historical Center
 

Unique transports of the United States Navy
Destroyer tenders of the United States Navy
Spanish–American War auxiliary ships of the United States
Banana Wars ships of the United States
World War I auxiliary ships of the United States
Ships built by William Cramp & Sons
1890 ships